John Edward Fuller (born January 29, 1950) is a former Major League Baseball player. He played three games in one season with the Atlanta Braves from May 9 to May 12, 1974.

He made his Major League debut on May 9, 1974 against the Chicago Cubs at Wrigley Field. He popped out against Rick Reuschel in his only turn at bat, a pinch hit appearance in relief of pitcher Danny Frisella.

Two days later, he appeared in the second of his three Major League games, a contest against the San Francisco Giants at Atlanta Stadium. He scored the only run of his career after pinch hitting for Tom House.

He was double switched into the ninth inning of his final game on May 12, replacing Rowland Office in center field. He recorded his only inning in the field and the only putout of his Major League career on a fly ball from Garry Maddox. In the bottom half of the inning, he recorded his only hit, a single off Randy Moffitt.

References

External links

Atlanta Braves players
1950 births
Living people
Baseball players from California
Major League Baseball outfielders
Magic Valley Cowboys players
Greenwood Braves players
Raleigh-Durham Triangles players
Savannah Indians players
Savannah Braves players
Richmond Braves players